San Marino competed at the 1976 Summer Olympics in Montreal, Quebec, Canada. Ten competitors, eight men and two women, took part in seven events in three sports.

Athletics

Cycling

One cyclist represented San Marino in 1976.

Individual road race
 Daniele Cesaretti — did not finish (→ no ranking)

Shooting

References

External links
Official Olympic Reports

Nations at the 1976 Summer Olympics
1976 Summer Olympics
Summer Olympics